Marmaduke is a syndicated comic strip and the name of its main character, a Great Dane.

Marmaduke may also refer to:

People
 Marmaduke (name)
 John Dawson (musician), known as "Marmaduke", American country-rock musician
 John Smoltz, known as "Smoltzie" and "Marmaduke", American baseball pitcher

Entertainment
 Marmaduke (2010 film), a 2010 film based on the comic strip
 Marmaduke (2022 film), a 2022 film based on the comic strip
 Marmaduke Duke, Scottish rock duo
 "Marmaduke", a jazz song written by Charlie Parker

Characters
 Marmaduke Brooker, a character from the TV series Carpoolers, played by T. J. Miller
 Marmaduke "Chuffy" Chuffnell, 5th Baron Chuffnell, a fictional character in P. G. Wodehouse's Jeeves novels
 Marmaduke Temple, judge and land owner, a character in The Pioneers by James Fenimore Cooper

Other uses
 Marmaduke, Arkansas, United States

See also